The 2021 Scottish Labour leadership election was triggered on 14 January 2021 by the resignation of Richard Leonard as leader of the Scottish Labour Party, who had led the party since 2017. Two candidates were nominated, Anas Sarwar and Monica Lennon.

Ballots opened on 9 February and closed on 26 February. Sarwar was elected as leader on 27 February, winning 57.6% of the vote to Lennon's 42.4%.

Background 
Richard Leonard was elected as the leader of the Scottish Labour Party in 2017 when he defeated Anas Sarwar to win with 56.7% of the vote. In the 2019 European Parliament election, the party lost its two seats in European Parliament for the Scotland constituency, and in the 2019 general election, the party lost six of its seven Scottish MPs. Scottish Labour figures including Labour Members of the Scottish Parliament (MSPs) had called for him to resign during 2020 over the party's poor performance in opinion polls. A motion of no confidence in Leonard was proposed at the party's SEC (Scottish Executive Committee) but withdrawn due to a lack of support. Leonard resigned on 14 January 2021, saying that speculation about his leadership was a distraction from the party's message.

Procedure 
On 16 January, the Scottish Labour Executive Committee met and approved the procedure and timetable for the leadership election. Candidates needed to declare their intention to run by midnight on 17 January, with nominations opening the following day. To be formally nominated, a candidate needs to be nominated by at least four of the party's 23 MSPs or by the party's only MP, Ian Murray.

Timetable

Campaign 
On 16 January 2021, Anas Sarwar, the party's constitution spokesperson and a candidate in the 2017 Scottish Labour leadership election, announced in an article in The Guardian that he was standing in the election, saying that the Scottish Government should focus on achieving equality rather than independence. On 18 January, over a quarter of Scottish Labour councillors signed a letter endorsing Sarwar as leader.

Monica Lennon, the party's health spokesperson, announced she was standing on Twitter on 17 January. In 2020, she had called for the Scottish Labour Party to split from the UK-wide Labour Party.

On 19 January, it was announced that both candidates had received the required nominations for them to progress to the next stage.

On the same day as both candidates received the required nominations for the next stage, Lennon told The Herald that she supported Scottish Labour being the party of devo-max and believed that the party should not block a second independence referendum. She did not support a referendum being held at the current time due to the "pandemic and the need for economic recovery."

On 21 January, Sarwar published an article in LabourList establishing his priorities. In the article, he called for modernisation and professionalism in campaigning and set his agenda focusing on "poverty, inequality, schools, health and jobs."

On 2 February, Lennon laid out her vision on ending child poverty within a decade which was published in the Daily Record. She pledged to increase the child payment to £30 a week, provide funding to councils to provide extra support and to provide affordable homes for all.

On 9 February, BBC Scotland hosted a debate between the two candidates. Both candidates discussed their positions on Scottish independence, with Sarwar laying out his opposition to another referendum on independence. Additionally, both candidates suggested that Scottish income taxes should be increased, with Sarwar supporting a 5% increase for the highest tax band and a 2% increase for people earning over £100,000 while Lennon called for a 'national conversation' to look at the wider range of taxes while also supporting an increase for top earners.

On 10 February, Lennon called for increased investment into broadband, claiming that her plan would improve productivity and innovation as well as generating More high skilled jobs. Her proposal was supported by the Communications Workers Union.

On 15 February, Lennon was interviewed by LabourList in which she discussed her support for a 'third option' on any future independence referendum. Additionally she advocated for a 'bottom-up' approach to Labour's plans for devolution compared to the constitution commission established by the Leader of the National Party Keir Starmer.

On 21 February, Lennon pledged to make free universal music tuition in state schools a manifesto pledge if she was elected leader, this policy was welcomed by Stuart Braithwaite.

Lennon wrote an op-ed in Pink News, in which she voiced her support for reforming the Gender Recognition Act and criticised the SNP government for not doing it already. "I have spoken out to condemn the transphobia that so many trans and non-binary people face on a daily basis. I believe that we have a duty to stand by those who are being unfairly marginalised, and I will stand by the trans community now," she said. "Trans people should not have to go through a bureaucratic and dehumanising process to have the law recognise who they already are."

Hustings 
Several hustings were organised across late January to February.

Candidates

Declined 
The following people were speculated about as potential candidates but declined to stand.

 Jackie Baillie, deputy leader, finance spokesperson, and MSP for Dumbarton
 James Kelly, former justice spokesperson and MSP for Glasgow (endorsed Sarwar)
 Ian Murray, shadow Scotland secretary and MP for Edinburgh South (endorsed Sarwar)

Nominations 
The table below shows the number of nominations achieved by each candidate. Both candidates have received enough nominations to proceed to the next stage.

List of nominations 
Below is a list the MPs and MSPs who nominated each candidate. Both candidates also nominated themselves.

Monica Lennon 
Neil Findlay, MSP for Lothian
Rhoda Grant, MSP for Highlands and Islands
Alex Rowley, MSP for Mid Scotland and Fife
Elaine Smith, MSP for Central Scotland

Anas Sarwar 
Claire Baker, MSP for Mid Scotland and Fife
Claudia Beamish, MSP for South Scotland
Sarah Boyack, MSP for Lothian
Neil Bibby, MSP for West Scotland
Mary Fee, MSP for West Scotland
Iain Gray, MSP for East Lothian
Mark Griffin, MSP for Central Scotland
Daniel Johnson, MSP for Edinburgh Southern
James Kelly, MSP for Glasgow
Johann Lamont, MSP for Glasgow
Lewis Macdonald, MSP for North East Scotland
Jenny Marra, MSP for North East Scotland
Pauline McNeill, MSP for Glasgow
Ian Murray, MP for Edinburgh South
Colin Smyth, MSP for South Scotland
David Stewart, MSP for Highlands and Islands

Endorsements and supporting nominations

Monica Lennon

Labour politicians 
 Ged Killen, MP for Rutherglen and Hamilton West from 2017 to 2019

Organisations 
 Unite the Union
 UNISON Scotland Labour Link
 Communication Workers Union (CWU) - Scotland Region
 Scottish Labour Students
 Socialist Health Association Scotland
Christians on the Left
 Open Labour Scotland
 Socialist Educational Association Scotland
 Transport Salaried Staffs' Association (TSSA)
 Socialist Campaign Group
 Campaign for Socialism

Anas Sarwar

Labour politicians 

 Jack McConnell, First Minister of Scotland and leader of Scottish Labour from 2001 to 2007
 Frank McAveety, former leader of Glasgow City Council and former minister for tourism, culture and sport
 Gordon Brown, Prime Minister of the United Kingdom and leader of the Labour Party from 2007 to 2010

Organisations 
 Union of Shop, Distributive and Allied Workers (USDAW)
 Labour Movement for Europe
 BAME Labour Scotland
 GMB (trade union)
 Community
 National Union of Mineworkers (NUM)
Jewish Labour Movement
Scottish Co-operative Party
Socialist Environment and Resources Association (SERA)

Results
Results were announced on 27 February 2021.

Opinion polls

Best Leader

References

Notes 

Scottish Labour leadership elections
2021 in Scotland
2020s elections in Scotland
2021 elections in the United Kingdom
Scottish Labour leadership election
February 2021 events in the United Kingdom